The Sterns are a band from Boston, Massachusetts.  Their songwriting and performances are often compared with bands such as The Smiths, Squeeze, The English Beat, and XTC. The band members were previously members of the popular American ska bands, Mass. Hysteria and Westbound Train. The song "Supreme Girl" is a playable song on the 2008 video game Rock Band 2.

Band members
Chris Stern: vocals, guitar
Alex Stern: guitar, vocals
Zak Kahn: drums
Michael Sixx: keyboard

Former members
Emeen Zarookian: bass, vocals
Andrew Sadoway: drums

Discography
 Say Goodbye to the Camera (Watergate Records, 2005)
 Sinners Stick Together (Omnirox Entertainment, March 27, 2007)
 Savage Noble Steals the Ancient Riffs (Watergate Records, 2014)

References

External links
 Myspace Page
 Videos on YouTube

Musical groups from Boston